David Dale (1739–1806) was a Scottish industrialist, merchant, and a founding father of socialism

David Dale may also refer to:
 Sir David Dale, 1st Baronet (1829–1906), English industrialist
 David Dale (Australian politician) (1843–1901), member of the New South Wales Legislative Assembly
 David Dale (author) (born 1948), Australian author and journalist
 David Dale Gallery & Studios, an art gallery in Glasgow, Scotland